Estadio Cuauhtémoc is a football stadium in Puebla City, Mexico. It is the home of Club Puebla   . It is currently the fourth-biggest football stadium in Mexico by capacity. The stadium has been the host of the 1970 FIFA World Cup and the 1986 FIFA World Cup. From November 2014 – 2015, the stadium went through massive renovations.

As of November 2015, Cuauhtémoc Stadium is considered to be an innovation in textile design and sports architecture in Mexico, since it is the first and only stadium in Latin America to have a facade totally covered with ETFE.

History

Estadio Cuauhtémoc has been the home for Puebla F.C. for the last 40 years and has witnessed various national and international tournaments the stadium has located in Puebla, Puebla Mexico.

The Stadium was originally designed in 1965 by architect Pedro Ramírez Vázquez, who also designed El Estadio Azteca and the Basilica of Our Lady of Guadalupe.

It was inaugurated on October 6, 1968 during the pre-inauguration of the 1968 Summer Olympics. It is named after the Mexican brewery Cuauhtémoc-Moctezuma, who paid for most of the construction.

In its first years of existence the club had a capacity of 35,000, which was expanded in 1986 for the 1986 FIFA World Cup. A mural that had been painted by Jesús Corro Ferrer, which represented the human race, had to be covered up. The stadium has an official capacity for 42,648, though on some occasions it has had attendance of above 50,000 . The Stadium is the 4th largest, as well as the tallest, stadium in Mexico, behind the Estadio Jalisco in Jalisco.

The stadium has hosted 2 Mexican Primera División finals. The first came in the 1982-83 tournament when Puebla F.C. defeated C.D. Guadalajara

The second final was played in the 1989-90 tournament against Club Universidad de Guadalajara where Puebla managed to beat the club from Jalisco 4-3. The stadium has also hosted the now defunct Copa México tournament, which the club managed to win in 1990, becoming just the 5th stadium to host both finals and have its home team win.

The stadium has also hosted club international tournaments, such as the CONCACAF Champions League and Copa Interamericana. In 2008 the stadium was supposed to host its first Copa Sudamericana tournament, but did not after the CONCACAF decided to pull out of all CONMEBOL competitions due to the clubs' lack of interest in the domestic conference tournaments.

1970 FIFA World Cup

Estadio Cuauhtémoc played host to the Uruguay national football team for the 1970 FIFA World Cup. In the first game on June 2, 1970 Uruguay defeated Israel 2-0. The second match was against Italy, which ended in a scoreless draw. The third match was against Sweden, where Uruguay fell 1-0. Players such as Sandro Mazzola and Luigi Riva went on to play in the finals against Brazil, which they lost to 4-1.

1986 FIFA World Cup

In 1986 Mexico hosted the 13th World Cup, becoming the first country to ever host the competition for a second time. This occurred due to Colombia announcing in 1983 that they were not going to be available to organize the tournament.

In this World Cup, Puebla played a bigger role than the previous one in 1970. This time, the defending champions Italy played at El Estadio Cuauhtémoc. Italy played against Argentina on July 5, 1986, where they tied 1–1 with a goal from the football legend Diego Armando Maradona.
The second game was against the Korea Republic national football team, who Italy managed to defeat 3–2.

In the round of 16 match, Argentina defeated Uruguay 1-0 in El Estadio Cuauhtémoc, which was played on June 5, 1986. In the Quarter Finals, the stadium hosted the match between Spain and Belgium which ended in a 1–1 draw, sending them to extra time, and ultimately to a penalty shootout. Van der Elst would score the final and deciding goal, sending Belgium to the semi finals. In that match, the stadium registered the biggest crowd with an attendance of 45,000.

In 2012 the state of Puebla was named to host the 2013 CONCACAF U-20 Championship.

2015 Renovation 

Puebla FC announced a complete renovation of the stadium that was set to begin in the late 2014. The stadium was old, in bad condition, and needed a fresh new image. In early 2014, the Governor of Puebla, Rafael Moreno Valle Rosas announced the official project.

The stadium would grow in capacity from 42,648 to 51,726 spectators, and would be completely remodeled from the inside, with 2 new ramps built in the north and south side of the stadium, along many other things.

Initially the facade of the stadium would be covered with crystal.

Dünn Lightweight Architecture, experts in sports and textile architecture in Mexico and Latin America, made a new proposal with ETFE because of the many advantages that ETFE had over other materials for that particular project. ETFE has been used in many world renowned architectural works, such as the Water Cube for the Olympics in Beijing,  and by many European stadiums such as the Allianz Arena in Munich.

Renovations started in November 2014 and were initially planned to be done by October 2015. Due to the city's rainy season, construction slowed down and in August 2015 it was announced that the construction would be done by November 2015. As of November 2015, the Cuauhtémoc stadium would be the first and only stadium in Mexico and Latin America to have a facade completely covered with ETFE.  On November 18 the stadium was reopened in a friendly match against Boca Juniors of Argentina before Puebla's final week of Liga MX Apertura 2015.

Matches from World Cups and Olympic Games

2013 CONCACAF U-20 Championship

Group C

Group D

Tournaments Held

National Competitions

 Liga MX
 Segunda División de México
 Ascenso MX
 Copa MX
 Campeón de Campeones

International Competitions

 1968 Summer Olympics
 1970 FIFA World Cup
 1983 FIFA World Youth Championship
 1986 FIFA World Cup
 CONCACAF Champions League
 Copa Interamericana
 2013 CONCACAF Under-20 Championship

References

See also
List of football stadiums in Mexico

Sports venues in Puebla
Cuauhtemoc
1970 FIFA World Cup stadiums
1986 FIFA World Cup stadiums
Club Puebla
Venues of the 1968 Summer Olympics
Olympic football venues
Sports venues completed in 1968
1968 establishments in Mexico